Frank Stewart Regan (October 3, 1862–July 25, 1944) was an American businessman and politician.

Biography
Regan was born in Rockford, Illinois  and graduated from Rockford High School. He was involved with the Rockford Abstract Company. Regan served on the Rockford City Council. Regan served in the Illinois House of Representatives in 1899 and 1900 and was elected on the Prohibition Party ticket. He was elected from the 10th district which included Winnebago and Ogle counties in northern Illinois. He was the Prohibition Party's candidate for Illinois Attorney General in 1908 and Illinois Treasurer in 1930. He served as the vice-president nominee on the Prohibition Party ticket in the 1932 United States presidential election. Regan died in Canton, Illinois, from a skull fracture, after falling in a bathtub at his son's home.

Notes

External links

1862 births
1944 deaths
Politicians from Rockford, Illinois
Businesspeople from Illinois
Illinois Prohibitionists
Illinois city council members
Members of the Illinois House of Representatives
1932 United States vice-presidential candidates
Prohibition Party (United States) vice presidential nominees
Accidental deaths in Illinois
Accidental deaths from falls